The Single Guy is an American sitcom television series that ran for two seasons on NBC, from September 21, 1995, to April 14, 1997. It starred Jonathan Silverman as struggling New York City writer Jonathan Eliot and followed several of his close friends (some of whom came and left as the show was re-tooled between seasons). The series also starred Joey Slotnick as Eliot's best friend Sam Sloan, Ming-Na Wen as Sam's wife Trudy and Ernest Borgnine as doorman Manny, throughout its entire run. The Single Guy was created by Brad Hall.

Cast

Main
 Jonathan Silverman as Jonathan Eliot
 Joey Slotnick as Sam Sloan
 Ernest Borgnine as Manny Cordoba
 Ming-Na Wen as Trudy Sloan
 Mark Moses as Matt Parker (season 1)
 Jessica Hecht as Janeane Percy-Parker (season 1)
 Shawn Michael Howard as Russell (season 2)
 Olivia d'Abo as Marie Blake (season 2)

Recurring
 Jensen Daggett as Charlie McCarthy (season 2)
 Dan Cortese as Dan Montgomery (season 2)

Episodes

Season 1 (1995–96)

Season 2 (1996–97)

Beginning and reception
While the series was favored enough by NBC to earn a timeslot in its coveted "Must-See-TV" Thursday night line-up, it ultimately failed to generate enthusiasm with critics and viewers.  It was largely written-off as one in a long line of "singles in the city" sitcoms that emerged in the mid-1990s, following the success of Seinfeld.  Many of that hit show's calling cards were emulated in The Single Guy, from the neurotic best friend who occasionally does reprehensible things, to its main character's rotating cast of flawed girlfriends. Jonathan and friends would also regularly hang out at a local coffee shop, The Bagel Cafe, which was seen by some viewers as too similar to that of the critically acclaimed NBC sitcom, Friends of which they had a guest star crossover with David Schwimmer's character, Ross Geller.

Ending
Perhaps aware of its impending cancellation, the series ended its second and final season with Jonathan Eliot married in Las Vegas, thus ending his single status.

Ultimately, it was one of the highest rated shows to ever get canceled, consistently attaining 4th or 5th place in the Nielsen ratings. Most attribute this to the fact that it was hammocked in the coveted 8:30pm EST slot, between Friends and Seinfeld. According to Entertainment Weekly, when the show was moved to a different time slot, its position in the ratings plummeted.

Ross Geller (played by David Schwimmer), a character from the sitcom Friends, appeared on the show.

References

External links
 
 

1995 American television series debuts
1997 American television series endings
1990s American romantic comedy television series
NBC original programming
1990s American sitcoms
Television series by Castle Rock Entertainment
Television series by Sony Pictures Television
Television series by Universal Television
Television shows set in New York City
English-language television shows
Latino sitcoms